"Changsha" (Chinese: 沁园春·长沙) is a poem written by Mao Zedong in 1925. It is considered by many Chinese to be of high literary quality and one of the best of Mao's poems.

See also 
Changsha

External links
Poem translated into English and German at Infopartisan.net.

Chinese poems
Works by Mao Zedong